Amer Krcić (born 23 May 1989) is a Slovenian football midfielder who plays for SAK Klagenfurt.

Honours
Domžale
Slovenian Championship: 2007–08
Slovenian Cup: 2010–11

External links
NZS profile 

1989 births
Living people
Sportspeople from Kranj
Slovenian footballers
Association football midfielders
NK Domžale players
NK Dob players
NK Krka players
NK Rudar Velenje players
NK Radomlje players
Slovenian PrvaLiga players
Slovenian Second League players
Slovenian expatriate footballers
Expatriate footballers in Austria
Slovenian expatriate sportspeople in Austria
Slovenia youth international footballers